The brothers of Jesus or the adelphoi are named in the New Testament as James, Joses (a form of Joseph), Simon, and Jude, and unnamed sisters are mentioned in Mark and Matthew. They may have been: (1) the sons of Mary, the mother of Jesus, and Joseph, (2) sons of Mary the wife of Cleophas and sister of Mary, the mother of Jesus; or (3) sons of Joseph by a former marriage. While option 1 is described as the "most natural inference" from the New Testament, those who uphold the perpetual virginity of Mary reject the idea of biological brethren and maintain that the brothers and sisters were either cousins of Jesus (option 2, the position of the Catholic Church) or children of Joseph from a previous marriage (option 3, the Orthodox Churches).

Etymology 
According to context, the Greek plural noun ἀδελφοί (adelphoi), from a- (‘same) and delphys (‘womb), may mean physical brothers, physical brothers and sisters, figurative brothers, or figurative brothers and sisters. It is distinct from anepsios, meaning cousin, nephew, niece, and this word is never used to describe James and the other siblings of Jesus. Aramaic, the native language of Jesus and his disciples, lacked a word for "cousin", but it had the phrase "bar dad", meaning "son of an uncle", and the Septuagint, the Greek translation of the Old Testament made in the last few centuries before Christ, never translates "bar dad" or its Hebrew equivalent "ben dod" as “brother” or “sister.”

Adelphoi (brethren) of Jesus

Mark 6 names James, Joses, Judas (conventionally known in English as Jude) and Simon as the brothers of Jesus, and Matthew 13, which probably used Mark as its source, gives the same names in different order, James, Joseph, Simon and Judas. "Joseph" is simply the longer form of "Joses", and so it appears that James was the eldest and Joses/Joseph the next, but as Matthew has reversed the order of the last two it is uncertain who was the youngest. Unnamed sisters are mentioned in Mark 6:3 and Matthew 13:56 and may be implied in Mark 3:35 and Matthew 12:46, but their number is unknown.

The gospels indicate a rift between Jesus and his brothers in the early part of his ministry (see Mark 3:31-35 and the parallel passages in Matthew 12:46-50 and Luke 8:19-21), and they never appear among his followers during his lifetime. John has Jesus's brothers advising him to go to Judea despite being aware that his life would be in danger, and they are absent from his burial, which should have been their responsibility, but they do appear in Acts 1:14 with the Eleven (i.e., the remaining disciples after the betrayal by Judas Iscariot): "These all (the Eleven) were persevering in prayer along with the women, with Mary the mother of Jesus, and with his brothers."

In 1 Corinthians 15:3–7 Paul lists a "James" among those to whom the risen Christ had appeared, and most scholars agree that this refers to James the brother of Jesus. The 2nd century historian Hegesippus (c.110 – 180 AD) reports that James the brother of Jesus came to be known as James the Just, and Eusebius of Caesarea (died 339) says that he spent so much of his life in prayer that his knees became "like the knees of a camel." According to Clement of Alexandria, reported by Eusebius, he was chosen as bishop of Jerusalem, and from the time when Peter left Jerusalem after Herod's attempt to kill him (Acts 12) he appears as the principal authority in the Jerusalem church, presiding at the Council of Jerusalem recorded in Acts 15. In Galatians 1:19 Paul tells how he went to Jerusalem a few years after his conversion and met Cephas (Peter) but no other apostles, only "James, the brother of the Lord"; Paul's Greek leaves it unclear whether he includes, or does not include, James among the apostles. He goes on to describe a second visit fourteen years later when he met the "pillars of the Church", James and Peter and John; James is mentioned first and seems to be the primary leader among these three. In chapter 2 he describes how he and Peter were later in Antioch and in the habit of dining with gentile Christians in breach of Jewish torah, until "certain people from James" came and Peter withdrew, "fearing those who belong to the circumcision." The 1st century historian Josephus tells how he was martyred by the Jews in 62 CE on charges of breaking the Jewish Law.

Paul records in 1 Corinthians that the other brothers of Jesus (that is, other than James, who is portrayed as rooted in Jerusalem) travelled as evangelists, and that they were married ("Do we not have the right to be accompanied by a believing wife, as do the other apostles and the brothers of the Lord and Cephas (Peter)?" - 1 Corinthians 9:5). The 3rd century Apostolic Father Eusebius left a list of 12 bishops of the early church, of whom two, Joseph/Joses and Jude, may be the brothers of Jesus. The number of sisters and their names are not specified in the New Testament, but the apocryphal 3rd century Gospel of Philip mentions a Mary, and the Salome who appears in the late 2nd century Gospel of James is arguably other sister.

The author of the epistle of James introduces himself as "James, a servant of God and of the Lord Jesus Christ". He does not identify himself as the brother of Jesus or an apostle or a leader of the church in any way, but one recent study characterises this letter as "the most Jewish text in the New Testament". The epistle of Jude identifies its author as "Jude...the brother of James", but today there is widespread, although not unanimous, support for the view that it was composed in the early part of the 2nd century by an unknown author borrowing the name of the brother of Jesus. Hegesippus mentions a Simon or Simeon (the names are equivalent) who became leader of the Jerusalem church after the death of James, but makes this Simon a son of Clopas, the brother of Joseph.

Relationship to Jesus

The 19th century scholar J.B. Lightfoot identified three possible positions on the relationship to Jesus of those called his brothers and sisters by reference to their 4th century advocates, namely the Helvidian (after Helvidius, who wrote c.380), the Epiphanian (after Epiphanius of Salamis, 315-403), and the Hieronymian (after Jerome, 349-419/20). A fourth position, not mentioned by Lightfoot, is that the adelphoi were full-blooded brothers and sisters of Jesus.

Full blood-brothers and sisters of Jesus
This position rejects the virgin birth of Jesus and accepts his brothers and sisters as precisely that, which it seems to have been restricted to a 2nd century Jewish Christian sect called the Ebionites, who rejected the incarnation and divinity of Jesus.

Half-brothers and sisters of Jesus (Helvidian view)
The view of Helvidius was that the adelphoi were full siblings of Jesus born to Mary and Joseph after the firstborn Jesus. This is the most common Protestant position, and is taken today by a large number of scholars, including a few who identify as Roman Catholic. The following hypothetical family tree is from :

Stepbrothers of Jesus (Epiphanian view)
The Epiphanian view, named after its main proponent, the fourth-century bishop Epiphanius, and championed by the third century theologian Origen and fourth-century bishop Eusebius, the “brothers” and “sisters” mentioned in the New Testament are sons of Joseph from a previous marriage, and hence stepbrothers of Jesus; this is still the official position of the Eastern Orthodox churches.

Cousins of Jesus (Hieronymian view)
The Hieronymian view was put forward in the 4th century by Jerome, who argued that not only Mary, but Joseph too, had been a life-long virgin. Apparently voicing the general opinion of the Church, he held that the "brothers of Jesus" were the sons of Mary the "mother of James and Joses" mentioned in Mark 15:40, whom he identified with the wife of Clopas and sister of Mary, the mother of Jesus mentioned in John 19:25. The Roman Catholic church continues to teach that the adelphoi were cousins of Jesus. (The following family tree is from Richard Bauckham, "Jude and the Relatives of James")

Jerome's argument produces the unlikely result of two sisters both named Mary. A modern variant eliminates this by identifying Clopas as the brother of Joseph, thereby making the two Marys sisters-in-law; in this version  Jesus's cousin Simon is identified with Symeon the second leader of the church in Jerusalem. (The following family tree is from Richard Bauckham, "Jude and the Relatives of James")

Development of the tradition 

From the 2nd century onward the developing emphasis on ascetism and celibacy as the superior form of Christian practice, together with an emphasis on the chastity of Mary, led to the idea that she had been a virgin not only before, but during and after, the birth of Christ. There is no biblical basis for this idea, which in its earliest assertion appears in the mid-2nd century Protoevangelium of James; this depicts Mary as a life-long virgin, Joseph as an old man who marries her without physical desire, and the brothers of Jesus as Joseph's sons by an earlier marriage.

By the 3rd century, the doctrine of the perpetual virginity of Mary had become well established, but the unequivocal scriptural references to the brethren of Jesus raised obvious problems. The heretical Antidicomarianites ("opponents of Mary") maintained that, when Joseph became Mary's husband, he was a widower with six children, and he had normal marital relations with Mary, but they later held Jesus was not born of these relations. Bonosus was a bishop who in the late 4th century held Mary had other children after Jesus, for which the other bishops of his province condemned him. Important orthodox theologians such as Hippolytus (170–235), Eusebius (260/265–339/340) and Epiphanius (c. 310/320–403) defended it. Eusebius and Epiphanius held these children were Joseph's children from a previous marriage. Epiphanius adds Joseph became the father of James and his three brothers (Joses, Simeon, Judah) and two sisters (a Salome and a Mary or a Salome and an Anna) with James being the elder sibling. James and his siblings were not children of Mary but were Joseph's children from a previous marriage. Joseph's first wife died; many years later, at the age of eighty, "he took Mary (mother of Jesus)". According to Epiphanius the Scriptures call them "brothers of the Lord" to confound their opponents. Origen (184–254) also wrote "according to the Gospel of Peter the brethren of Jesus were sons of Joseph by a former wife, whom he married before Mary".

The History of Joseph the Carpenter, probably written in Egypt in the 5th century and heavily indebted to the Protoevangelium of James, depicts Joseph as an old widower with children from a previous marriage, thus clarifying the New Testament references to Jesus' brothers.

According to the surviving fragments of the work Exposition of the Sayings of the Lord of the Apostolic Father Papias of Hierapolis, who lived circa 70–163 AD, "Mary the wife of Cleophas or Alphaeus" would be the mother of James the Just, Simon, Judas (identified as Jude the Apostle), and Joseph (Joses).  Papias identifies this "Mary" as the sister of Mary, mother of Jesus, and thus as the maternal aunt of Jesus. The Anglican theologian J.B. Lightfoot dismissed Papias' evidence as spurious.

The Gospel of Pseudo-Matthew, which was probably written in the seventh century, states the brothers of Jesus were his cousins.

Roman Catholic and Eastern Christianity maintain that Mary was a perpetual virgin; early Protestant leaders, including the Reformer Martin Luther, and Reformed theologian Huldrych Zwingli, also held this view, as did John Wesley, one of the founders of Methodism. Eine Christliche Lehrtafel (A Christian Catechism), issued by Anabaptist leader Balthasar Hubmaier, teaches the perpetual virginity of the Virgin Mary too. The Catholic Church, following Jerome, conclude that the adelphoi were Jesus' cousins, while Eastern Orthodox Church, following Eusebius and Epiphanius, argue they were Joseph's children from a previous marriage. Anglicans, Lutherans, and Methodists concur with this view.

Other Christian denominations, such as Baptists, view the adelphoi as Jesus' half-brothers or do not specify, since the accounts in the Gospels do not speak of Mary's relationship to them but only to Jesus.

Absence of Jesus' brothers 
There are some events in scripture where brothers or sisters of Jesus are not shown, e.g., when Jesus was lost in the Temple and during his crucifixion.  reports the visit of Mary, Joseph, and Jesus to the Temple in Jerusalem when Jesus was 12 years old but does not mention any siblings. Robert Eisenman is of the belief Luke sought to minimise the importance of Jesus' family by whatever means possible, editing James and Jesus' brothers out of the Gospel record. The Catholic apologist Keating argues Mary and Joseph rushed without hesitation straight back to Jerusalem when they realized Jesus was lost, which they would surely have thought twice about doing if there were other children (Jesus' blood brothers or sisters) to look after.

The Gospel of John records the sayings of Jesus on the cross, i.e., the pair of commands "Woman, behold your son!" and "Behold, thy mother!", then states "from that hour the disciple took her unto his own home". Since the era of the Church Fathers this statement has been used to reason that after the death of Jesus there were no other biological children to look after Mary, and she had to be entrusted to the disciple. Constantine Zalalas argues it would have been against Jewish custom for Jesus to give his mother to the care of the disciple if Mary had other living sons, because the eldest son would always take responsibility for his mother. Karl Keating says, "It is hard to imagine why Jesus would have disregarded family ties and made this provision for his Mother if these four [James, Joseph/Joses, Simon, Jude] were also her sons". Pope John Paul II also says the command "Behold your son!" was the entrustment of the disciple to Mary in order to fill the maternal gap left by the death of her only son on the cross. Vincent Taylor points out difficulties in this interpretation of the text: it ignores both the fact that Jesus' brothers opposed his claims, and the position of honour of John, the beloved disciple.

Desposyni - descendants of Jesus' family

The early Christian historian Sextus Julius Africanus (died c.240), in his "Genealogy of the Holy Gospels", referred to "relatives of our Lord according to the flesh" whom he called desposyni, meaning "from the Lord's family".

See also
 Gospel of James (also called the Protoevangelium of James)
 Hong Xiuquan
 James Ossuary

Notes

References

Citations

Bibliography

External links 
 
 
 

 
1st-century Christianity
Sibling groups
Bible-related controversies
Christianity in Jerusalem
Christian terminology
Family of Jesus
Followers of Jesus
Life of Jesus in the New Testament
People from Nazareth